The 19039 / 19040 Bandra Terminus–Muzaffarpur Avadh Express is an Express train belonging to Indian Railways – Western Railways zone that runs between Bandra Terminus and  in India.

It operates as train number 19039 from Bandra Terminus to Muzaffarpur Junction and as train number 19040 in the reverse direction.

Coaches

The 19039/40 Bandra Terminus–Muzaffarpur Avadh Express presently has 1 AC 2 tier, 2 AC 3 tier, 15 Sleeper class, 2 General Unreserved & 2 Seating cum Luggage Rake. In addition, it has a 1 pantry car.

Service

19039 Bandra Terminus–Muzaffarpur Avadh Express covers the distance of 2155 kilometres in 47 hrs 10 mins (45.69 km/hr).
19040 Muzaffarpur–Bandra Terminus Avadh Express covers the distance of 2155 kilometres in 46 hrs 35 mins (46.26 km/hr).

Routeing

Timings

19039 Bandra Terminus–Muzaffarpur Avadh Express leaves Bandra Terminus every Monday, Thursday & Saturday at 22:40 PM IST and reaches Muzaffarpur Junction at 21:50 PM IST on the 2nd day.
19040 Muzaffarpur–Bandra Terminus Avadh Express leaves Muzaffarpur Junction every Tuesday, Thursday & Sunday at 06:00 AM IST and reaches Bandra Terminus at 04:35 AM IST on the 2nd day.

Traction 

It is now regularly hauls by a Vadodara-based WAP-7 (HOG)-equipped locomotive from end to end.

Rake sharing

The train shares its rake with 19037/19038 Bandra Terminus–Gorakhpur Avadh Express.

External links

References 

Transport in Mumbai
Transport in Muzaffarpur
Express trains in India
Rail transport in Maharashtra
Rail transport in Gujarat
Rail transport in Rajasthan
Rail transport in Uttar Pradesh